Eeklo is a railway station in Eeklo, East Flanders, Belgium.  The station opened on 25 June 1861 on the Line 58. The train services are operated by NMBS/SNCB.

The current building was built in the 80's by architect Jacques Devincke. The railway station is in the city centre.

The station used to not be the terminus with the line continuing via Maldegem to Bruges . The Eeklo - Maldegem section of this line still operates as a museum railway by the Stoomcentrum Maldegem . For practical reasons, this association has constructed a platform on the other side of Oostveldstraat, where their museum trains stop. The connection between that line and the SNCB network is currently only used sporadically. The station has 3 platform tracks and one (decommissioned) dead end track.

Train services
The station is served by the following service(s):

References

Railway stations in Belgium
Railway stations opened in 1861
1861 establishments in Belgium
Railway stations in East Flanders
Eeklo